Valeri Ivanovich Novikov (born November 1, 1957 in Moscow) is a retired Soviet football player.

Honours
 1980 UEFA European Under-21 Football Championship winner.

Individual
Toulon Tournament Best Goalkeeper: 1979

International career
Novikov made his debut for USSR on April 5, 1978 in a friendly against Finland, USSR won 10:2 but Novikov allowed two goals in the 45 minutes that he played. He kept clean sheet in the only other game he played for USSR, 1984 friendly against Mexico.

References

External links
  Profile

1957 births
Living people
Soviet footballers
Soviet Union international footballers
FC Lokomotiv Moscow players
PFC CSKA Moscow players
Footballers from Moscow
Association football goalkeepers